Justine Henin was the defending champion, but lost in the final to Venus Williams 7–5, 6–2.

It was the 1st title in the season for Williams and the 22nd of her career.

Seeds
The first two seeds received a bye into the second round.

Draw

Finals

Top half

Bottom half

External links
 Tournament draws (ITF)
 Tournament draws (WTA)

Thalgo Australian Women's Hardcourts - Singles
2002 Thalgo Australian Women's Hardcourts